The Kula Plate was an oceanic tectonic plate under the northern Pacific Ocean south of the Near Islands segment of the Aleutian Islands. It has been subducted under the North American Plate at the Aleutian Trench, being replaced by the Pacific Plate.

The name Kula is from a Tlingit language word meaning "all gone".  As the name suggests, the Kula Plate was entirely subducted around 48 Ma and today only a slab in the mantle under the Bering Sea remains. There is some evidence of a Resurrection Plate broken off from the Kula Plate and also subducted.

Geological history

The Kula Plate began subducting under the Pacific Northwest region of North America during the Late Cretaceous period much like the Pacific Plate does today, supporting a large volcanic arc system from northern Washington to southwestern Yukon called the Coast Range Arc.

There was a triple junction of three ridges between the Kula Plate to the north, the Pacific Plate to the west and the Farallon Plate to the east. The Kula Plate was subducted under the North American Plate at a relatively steep angle, so that the Canadian Rockies are primarily composed of thrusted sedimentary sheets with relatively little contribution of continental uplift, while the American Rockies are characterized by significant continental uplift in response to the shallow subduction of the Farallon Plate.

About 55 million years ago, the Kula Plate began an even more northerly motion. Riding on the Kula Plate was the Pacific Rim Terrane consisting of volcanic and sedimentary rock. It was scraped off and plastered against the continental margin, forming what is today Vancouver Island.

By 40 million years ago, the compressional force of the Kula Plate ceased. The existence of the Kula Plate was inferred from the westward bend in the alternating pattern of magnetic anomalies in the Pacific Plate.

See also
Farallon Plate
Kula-Farallon Ridge
Pacific-Kula Ridge
Izanagi Plate

References

External links
Reconstruction of the Kula Plate
Kula Plate in the area of the present Northwestern United States
Kula plate when it separates from the Farallon plate

Tectonic plates
Natural history of North America
Historical geology
Mesozoic geology
Paleogene geology
Geology of the Pacific Ocean
Bering Sea